Maranta arundinacea, also known as arrowroot, maranta, West Indian arrowroot, obedience plant, Bermuda arrowroot, araru, araruta, ararao or hulankeeriya, is a large, perennial herb found in rainforest habitats. Arrowroot flour is now produced commercially mostly in St. Vincent and the Grenadines.  Arrowroot was one of the earliest plants to be domesticated for food in northern South America, with evidence of exploitation or cultivation of the plant dating back to 8200 BCE.

Description

Its leaves are lanceolate. The edible part of the plant is the rhizome. Twin clusters of small white flowers bloom about 90 days after planting. The plant rarely produces seed and reproduction is typically by planting part of a rhizome with a bud. Rhizomes are ready for harvesting 10–12 months after planting as leaves of the plant begin to wilt and die.

The arrowroot plant probably originated in the Amazon rainforest of north-western Brazil and neighboring countries.

In the continental United States, arrowroot is cultivated as an outside plant only in southern Florida.

Distribution
Maranta arundinacea is native to Mexico, Central America, the West Indies (Cuba, Hispaniola, Puerto Rico, Trinidad, Lesser Antilles) and South America (Brazil, Peru, Ecuador, Colombia, Venezuela, Suriname, Guyana, French Guiana). It is widely cultivated in the many warm countries and is considered naturalized in Jamaica, Bahamas, Bermuda, the Netherlands Antilles, India, Sri Lanka, China (Guangdong, Guangxi, Hainan, Yunnan), Taiwan, Volcano Islands, Mauritius, Réunion, Equatorial Guinea, Gabon, Florida, Cambodia, Indonesia and the Philippines.

The Caribbean island nation of St. Vincent and the Grenadines is the world's largest grower of arrowroot and producer of arrowroot flour.  In Kerala, India, arrowroot, locally called bilathi koova, is cultivated to produce an easily digestible starch.

Prehistoric domestication
Radio-carbon dating has established that M. arundinacea was one of the first plants domesticated in prehistoric South America. Arrowroot, along with leren (Calathea allouia), squash (Cucurbita moschata), and bottle gourd (Lagenaria siceraria) became cultivated plants in northern South American and Panama between 8200 BC and 5600 BC. Some archaeologists believe that arrowroot was first used by Native Americans not as food but as a poultice to extract poison from wounds caused by spears or arrows.

Evidence of the use of arrowroot as food has been found dating from 8200 BC at the San Isidro archaeological site in the upper Cauca River valley of Colombia near the city of Popayán. Starch grains from arrowroot were found on grinding tools. Thus, the plant may have been introduced at San Isidro from nearby lowland rain forest areas in a pioneering effort to cultivate it.

Domestication of arrowroot at these early dates was probably on a small-scale with gardens of only a few plants being planted in alluvial soils near streams to ensure the steady supply of moisture needed during the growing season by arrowroot and other similar root crops. The exploitation of arrowroot was probably complicated by the difficulty of extracting the starch from the fibrous roots. The roots must first be pounded or ground then soaked in water to separate the starch from the fibers. The starch is excellent for digestibility.

Uses
Currently arrowroot starch is used in food preparations and confectionery, and for industrial applications such as cosmetics and glue. The residue of starch extraction has a high fibre content and can be fed to livestock.

Gallery

References

External links

arundinacea
Root vegetables
Crops originating from the Americas
House plants
Economy of Saint Vincent and the Grenadines
Plants described in 1753
Taxa named by Carl Linnaeus
Flora of Mexico
Flora of South America
Early agriculture in Mesoamerica
Crops originating from South America
Tropical agriculture
Native American cuisine
Edible plants